Rule 62 is the third studio album by Canadian-born American musician Whitney Rose. It was released on October 6, 2017, through Six Shooter Records.

Track listing

References

2017 albums
Six Shooter Records albums